John Fox (April 24, 1953 – May 30, 2012) was an American comedian.

Life
John Fox was born John Edward Moore April 24, 1953 while his father was stationed at Camp Lejeune, North Carolina.  He lived in Waukegan, Illinois until age 8 when the family moved to Zion, Illinois.  The family returned to Waukegan when John was 13.   He was an avid baseball player and was a lifelong Cubs fan.

Career
Fox's first show was on June 14, 1979 at the World Famous Comedy Store. Known as the Nick Nolte of comedy, Fox had numerous television appearances on shows, including Norm Crosby's Comedy Shop, Star Search, Make Me Laugh, and  Showtime Comedy Club Network. He appeared in the stand-up videos Truly Tasteless Jokes and Comedy's Dirtiest Dozen. He voiced the role of a pig in the animated feature Rover Dangerfield. He had been featured on "The Bob & Tom Show" and was the inspiration for the song "The Legend of John Fox," by Pat Godwin. Fox also appeared on Rodney Dangerfield's HBO special, Opening Night at Rodney's Place and the first Redneck Comedy Roundup DVD alongside comedians Jeff Foxworthy, Bill Engvall, and Ron White.

A popular part of Fox's routine was talking about his various previous jobs.

Death
Fox was diagnosed with colon cancer in October 2011.  He died of complications from the cancer in May 2012 at the age of 59.

Discography
 Assorted Nuts LIVE FROM Laughs Unlimited (1985)
 Very Unsensitive (1988)
 The Most Dangerous Man in Comedy (1988)
 John Fox (1988)
 Joy Jelly (1989)
 I'm Fat, I'm 40 (1999)

References

External links

American male comedians
1953 births
2012 deaths
20th-century American comedians
21st-century American comedians
People from Camp Lejeune, North Carolina
People from Waukegan, Illinois
People from Zion, Illinois
Comedians from Illinois